Kipoi Tonny Nsubuga (born 26 June 1978), also known as Tony Kipoi, was a member of the ninth Parliament of Uganda from 2011 until 2014, representing Bubulo West Constituency in Manafwa District. A member of the National Resistance Movement (NRM), he was elected with 72% of the vote. As of April 2018, he is facing a court martial for treason, among other charges.

Early life 
Kipoi was born in Bunefule–Bugobero subcounty. His father was a policeman who died when Kipoi was still a young boy, and his mother a domestic worker. As a child, he was constantly moving between Mbale, Nairobi and Kampala. He has three brothers, Michael, Robert and Joseph. Kipoi is also referred to by his initials TK and his clan name Kipoi.

Kipoi is the founder of the Coalition of Market Venders of Uganda (COMAVU), a body which advocates for the right of the under privileged traders in Uganda. He also ran multimedia companies in South Africa, Botswana and the Netherlands. From May 2006 to 2009, he switched into community based activities back home, focussing on health, education, and orphans

Career 
Kipoi was inaugurated as the Member of Parliament of Bubulo West on 17 May 2011, after defeating incumbent Fred Bukeni, former minister Wanzusi Wasieba and others in the NRM primaries. He survived an immediate challenge to his election brought by 800 petitioners, with the Court of Appeal setting aside an order for a by-election made by the High Court. At the time of his election, Kipoi was the youngest directly-elected member of parliament at the age of 32.

Kipoi served on the Committee of Defense and Internal Affairs and Committee on Commissions, Statutory Authorities and State Enterprises (COSASE).

Kipoi was arrested in December 2012 and charged with treason on the grounds that he was recruiting personnel from Uganda as well as Congolese rebels as the basis for a potential coup. In June 2013, he was arrested separately on charges of car theft, before apparently fleeing to the Democratic Republic of the Congo (DRC) while on bail. The treason charges were withdrawn in February 2014, with proceedings transferred to a court martial. He was reported to have been arrested in the DRC in November 2013, but accorded "guest-of-the-state" status. He was then rearrested in February 2014 following an extradition request from Uganda, but as of November 2014 had not been transferred to Ugandan custody. In February 2018, Kipoi was arrested in Botswana, charged with four counts of obtaining money by false pretences and extradited to Uganda in early March.

In February 2014, Kipoi was expelled from Parliament for missing 15 sittings without a convincing explanation.

References

1978 births
Living people
Members of the Parliament of Uganda
National Resistance Movement politicians